Clonduff GAC is a Gaelic Athletic Association club, based in Hilltown County Down, Northern Ireland. It represents the 2 areas that make up the Clonduff parish, namely Hilltown and Cabra.

History
Press reports show the history of Gaelic football in Clonduff reaching as far back as 1887 when the parish sported two teams: the Hilltown Amateurs and The Red Hands. Gaelic games flourished for a few years but then subsided and it was not until 1910 that the parish again fielded a Gaelic team. During the next ten years the parish fielded teams at Junior and Senior level under names such as The Emeralds, The Harps and The Sarsfields.

1920 can be identified as the founding year of the modern Clonduff Shamrocks. Success on the playing field over the next few years was commonplace and it was in this era that Clonduff's long tradition of providing quality County players began – McPolin, Brannigan, Doyle, Mussen and O’Hanlon were synonymous with both the Clonduff and County teams.

For most of the thirties the club was hardly a force to be reckoned with but re-emerged in the early forties. Their tradition of providing County players was to the fore again and when Down won the 1946 All Ireland, Clonduff provided six of the panel.

In 1955 the club split into two distinct entities – Cabra and Hilltown – the two ends of the parish. Two years later they met in the County Final. The teams amalgamated in 1959 and the following year two of their players won All-Ireland Senior football medals with Kevin Mussen being the first Northerner to bring the Sam Maguire across the border.

The club opened its own grounds in 1968 and became one of the leading clubs in the newly formed Scór competitions.

In Centenary year, Clonduff published its McNamee Award winning history and in 1987 when Down won its second All Ireland Minor Championship, the club provided six of the panel. In the All Ireland wins of 1991 and 1994, Clonduff's Ross Carr played a pivotal role.  Cathal Murray was also on the panel in 1991.

Clonduff are one of the few clubs in the county who have senior teams in all 5 codes, (Football, Ladies Football, Hurling, Camogie and Handball), and have the biggest number of club members in Down GAA, outside of Belfast.

In recent times, the clubs Camogie team have been, by far, the most successful in the club. Since winning their first Senior Championship in 2007 they have won numerous more county championships, 3 Ulster Club Intermediate Championships and even landing the biggest of all by winning the All Ireland Intermediate Club Championship in 2018, the very first 15 a side All Ireland win in the clubs history.

Notable players
 Ross Carr - Former Down Footballer. Won 2 All Ireland Senior medals with Down in 1991 and 1994, and also won an All-star 1991.
 Kevin Mussen - First Man To bring the Sam Maguire cup to the North when he captained Down to An All-Ireland win 1960. Also won the all Ireland in 1961.
 Patsy O'Hagan - Also won All Ireland medals with successful Down teams of the 60s. First man to ever score a hat-trick of goals in Wembley Stadium.
 Cathal Murray Jnr - All-Ireland medal winner with Down in 1991. Minor All Ireland winners medal with Down in 1987
 Aidan Carr - Son of Ross, and long time intercounty player with Down.
 Darren O'Hagan - Ex Down Captain, 2019. Retired from Inter County Football in Nov 2022.
 Barry O'Hagan - Current Down player, 2022

The Meadow Of The Ox
The team crest depicts a scene with an ox, a thorn bush and a church.

It is reputed that St Comghall of Bangor sent his followers to this area of County Down to spread Christianity.   They began building their church in the townland of Ballynanny (located on The Kilkeel Road below Spelga Dam).  Each morning, the previous day's work would be demolished.  Upon investigation, it was discovered that an ox, belonging to the local Druid came down from the mountain (The Mournes) each night and razed the building.  One of the monks cut a thorn stick and stuck it into the ground between the ox's meadow and the new church.  The stick grew into a thorn bush and the monk defied the ox to pass the thorn bush - it never did and the building of the church was completed.  The area where the thorn bush allegedly grew is known as Bushtown to this day.  The church was eventually destroyed during Cromwell's invasion of Ireland in 1649.  The remains of the church are still standing today on the Kilkeel Road end of Old Clonduff Road.

Milestones

External links
Clonduff GAC Homepage
Official An Riocht GAA Club website
Official Down County website

Gaelic games clubs in County Down
Gaelic football clubs in County Down